SPS may refer to:

Law and government
 Agreement on the Application of Sanitary and Phytosanitary Measures of the WTO
 NATO Science for Peace and Security
 Single Payment Scheme, an EU agricultural subsidy
 The Standard Procurement System, for the US Department of Defense
 Somali Postal Service
 Staff and Personnel Support Branch, part of the British Army Adjutant General's Corps

Police and prisons
 Scottish Prison Service
 Singapore Prison Service, a government agency of the Government of Singapore under the hierarchy of the Ministry of Home Affairs
 Station police sergeant or station sergeant, former UK police rank
 State Police Services (India)
 Surrey Police Service, British Columbia, Canada
 Saskatoon Police Service, Saskatoon, Saskatchewan

Organisations
 Sahara Press Service, of the Sahrawi Arab Democratic Republic
 Sierra Peaks Section
 SPS Commerce
 SPS Technologies, Inc., acquired by Precision Castparts Corp.
 Sussex Piscatorial Society, a fishing club in the UK
 Swiss Society of Proteomics, of Life Sciences Switzerland

Education
 Sadiq Public School, a school in Bahawalpur, Punjab, Pakistan
 New York University School of Professional Studies
 Social and Political Sciences, of the University of Cambridge, UK
 Society of Physics Students
 Springfield Public Schools (Missouri), school district, US
 St. Patrick's Higher Secondary School, Asansol, India
 St. Paul's School (disambiguation), various schools

Political parties
 Socialist Party of Serbia (Socijalistička partija Srbije), a political party in Serbia
 Union of Right Forces (Soyuz Pravykh Sil), a former political party in Russia

Religion
 Saint Patrick’s Society for the Foreign Missions, Ireland, post-nominal
 Society for Pentecostal Studies

Science and technology
 Solanapyrone synthase, an enzyme
 Sucrose-phosphate synthase, a plant enzyme involved in sucrose biosynthesis
 Spark plasma sintering
 Special weather statement, US
 Stand-alone power system, an off-the-grid electricity system
 Standard positioning service, a Global Positioning System feature
 Super Proton Synchrotron, a particle accelerator at CERN

Computing
 Shell Processing Support, a file format for seismic data
 IBM 1401 Symbolic Programming System and IBM 1620/1710 Symbolic Programming System, assemblers

Medicine and psychology
 Sensory processing sensitivity, the defining personality trait of Highly Sensitive Persons (HSPs)
 Stiff person syndrome, a rare neurologic disorder
 Syntactic positive shift, a peak in brain activity

Military and space
 Service propulsion system in the Apollo service module
 Solar power satellite, to beam power to Earth
 Side protection system or torpedo belt of a warship
 SR-1 Vektor (Samozaryadnyj Pistolet Serdjukova – Serdyukov Self-loading pistol)

Transportation
 Wichita Falls Municipal Airport (IATA airport code)
 Spokane, Portland and Seattle Railway, a defunct railroad in the United States

Other uses
 Sony Imaging Pro Support, for  photographers
 SPS (Mongolia), a TV channel

See also

 SPs
 SP (disambiguation)